Carpenter School may refer to:
in Canada
Carpenter High School (Meadow Lake, Saskatchewan)

in the United States (by city then state)
Carpenter School No. 1, in Natchez, Mississippi, one of two Carpenter Schools
Carpenter School No. 2, in Natchez, Mississippi, second of two Carpenter Schools
Carpenter Middle School (Plano, Texas)
Carpenter High School (Carpenter, Wyoming)

See also
Carpenter House (disambiguation)